Kenmei Boku (朴賢明) is a Korean former baseball player who played in Japan. He played for the Osaka Tigers in the Japanese Baseball League. He reportedly ended up in North Korea and it is unknown if he is alive or dead.

References

External links

Date of death unknown
Osaka Tigers players
Year of birth missing